WJEV-LP is a Spanish Religious formatted broadcast radio station licensed to Dale City, Virginia and serving Dale City and Montclair in Virginia.  WJEV-LP is owned and operated by Ministerio de Vida.

References

External links
 Radio Vida Online
 

2014 establishments in Virginia
Spanish-language radio stations in the United States
Radio stations established in 2014
JEV-LP
JEV-LP
Prince William County, Virginia